Bucoda is a town in Thurston County, Washington, United States. The population was 600 at the 2020 census. The community refers to itself as the "World's Tiniest Town with the Biggest Halloween Spirit".

History
The first American settler at what is now Bucoda was Aaron Webster (1828–1911) who arrived in 1854.  In the 1860s Webster sold his claim and sawmill to Oliver Shead who officially named the settlement "Seatco", a native word meaning evil spirit or devil.  The Northern Pacific Railroad located a station at Seatco in 1872. Later the town was renamed Bucoda using the first two letters of three principal investors in local industries- Buckley, Coulter, and David.

In the 1880s investors began operations to mine coal in the area, but the coal was of poor quality and operations were sporadic.  From 1874 to 1888 Bucoda was the site of Washington's first territorial prison. It garnered a reputation as a harsh institution as the inmates were used for dangerous and brutal manual labor in local industry.   It was discontinued when the state opened the Washington State Penitentiary in Walla Walla, Washington.  Bucoda was officially incorporated on June 7, 1910.  The town had a water tower that was scrapped in the early 1980s. The Mutual Lumber Mill was so productive the town was once billed as the "Town with the Million Dollar Payroll". The mill burned down and was rebuilt only to have demand wane and once again it was consumed by flames.

Geography

Demographics

2010 census
As of the census of 2010, there were 562 people, 222 households, and 148 families living in the town. The racial makeup of the town was 91.6% White, 1.2% African American, 0.9% Native American, 0.5% Asian, 0.2% Pacific Islander, 1.8% from other races, and 3.7% from two or more races. Hispanic or Latino of any race were 5.7% of the population.

There were 222 households, of which 30.2% had children under the age of 18 living with them, 41.9% were married couples living together, 18.5% had a female householder with no husband present, 6.3% had a male householder with no wife present, and 33.3% were non-families. 22.5% of all households were made up of individuals, and 7.2% had someone living alone who was 65 years of age or older. The average household size was 2.53 and the average family size was 2.92.

The median age in the town was 40.3 years. 20.1% of residents were under the age of 18; 9.5% were between the ages of 18 and 24; 26.3% were from 25 to 44; 31.1% were from 45 to 64; and 12.8% were 65 years of age or older. The gender makeup of the town was 51.1% male and 48.9% female.

2000 census
As of the census of 2000, there were 628 people, 219 households, and 169 families living in the town. The population density was 1,419.7 people per square mile (551.1/km2). There were 236 housing units at an average density of 533.5 per square mile (207.1/km2). The racial makeup of the town was 92.04% White, 0.80% Native American, 2.23% Asian, 0.32% Pacific Islander, 1.27% from other races, and 3.34% from two or more races. Hispanic or Latino of any race were 2.07% of the population.

There were 219 households, out of which 37.0% had children under the age of 18 living with them, 56.6% were married couples living together, 15.1% had a female householder with no husband present, and 22.8% were non-families. 13.7% of all households were made up of individuals, and 4.1% had someone living alone who was 65 years of age or older. The average household size was 2.87 and the average family size was 3.18.

In the town, the age distribution of the population shows 29.8% under the age of 18, 8.8% from 18 to 24, 29.6% from 25 to 44, 23.4% from 45 to 64, and 8.4% who were 65 years of age or older. The median age was 34 years. For every 100 females, there were 109.3 males. For every 100 females age 18 and over, there were 117.2 males.

The median income for a household in the town was $34,286, and the median income for a family was $32,708. Males had a median income of $36,071 versus $22,321 for females. The per capita income for the town was $16,613. About 18.5% of families and 25.1% of the population were below the poverty line, including 41.2% of those under age 18 and 2.7% of those age 65 or over.

Arts and culture
Since 2009, the community becomes known as "Boo-coda", a moniker to represent its annual month-long Halloween festivities. The event is known for its Scary Nights Haunted House and hearse processions.

Media
Bucoda, Washington is the setting of episode 97 "We All Ignore the Pit" of the horror podcast The Magnus Archives.

See also

 List of cities and towns in Washington

References

External links

 

Towns in Thurston County, Washington
Towns in Washington (state)